Volatilization is the process whereby a dissolved sample is vaporised. In atomic spectroscopy this is usually a two-step process. The analyte is turned into small droplets in a nebuliser which are entrained in a gas flow which is in turn volatilised in a high temperature flame in the case of AAS or volatilised in a gas plasma torch in the case of ICP spectroscopy.

Herbicide volatilisation
Herbicide volatilisation refers to evaporation or sublimation of a volatile herbicide. The effect of gaseous chemical is lost at its intended place of application and may move downwind and affect other plants not intended to be affected causing crop damage. Herbicides vary in their susceptibility to volatilisation. Prompt incorporation of the herbicide into the soil may reduce or prevent volatilisation. Wind, temperature, and humidity also affect the rate of volatilisation with humidity reducing in. 2,4-D and dicamba are commonly used chemicals that are known to be subject to volatilisation but there are many others. Application of herbicides later in the season to protect herbicide-resistant genetically modified plants increases the risk of volatilisation as the temperature is higher and incorporation into the soil impractical.,

Herbicide applied as a powder or a mist can also drift in the wind in solid form as dust or liquid form as tiny drops. However, a transformation of known herbicides, such as glyphosate, dicamba or MCPA, into the form of herbicidal ionic liquids proved to be a solution to this particular problem since herbicidal ionic systems express lower susceptibility to volatilisation.

Notes

Analytical chemistry